"Her Kiss" is a song recorded by Swedish singer Boris René. The song was released as a digital download in Sweden on 4 February 2017 and peaked at number 50 on the Swedish Singles Chart. It is taking part in Melodifestivalen 2017, and qualified to andra chansen from the first semi-final on 4 February 2017. The song qualified from andra chansen on 4 March 2017. It was written by Tim Larsson and Tobias Lundgren.

Track listing

Chart performance

Weekly charts

Release history

References

Songs about kissing
2017 singles
2016 songs
English-language Swedish songs
Melodifestivalen songs of 2017
Swedish pop songs
Warner Music Group singles
Songs written by Tim Larsson
Songs written by Tobias Lundgren